Piripiri (sometimes called Piri Piri) is a sparsely populated area in the Manawatū-Whanganui region, on State Highway 2 and the Palmerston North–Gisborne line.

Piri means to cling. The Māori name of a clinging plant, piripiri (Acaena anserinifolia), is Anglicised as bidibid. Other places named Piripiri are -

 Piripiri Stream, a tributary of the Pohangina River, on the opposite side of the Ruahine Range from Piripiri, with Piripiri Hut, a free 2-bunk hut, by its headwaters
 a small settlement in the Waitomo District, with Mangapohue Natural Bridge and Piripiri Caves nearby
 Te Piripiri Stream, a tributary of the Tongariro River
 Te Piripiri Bay, Lake Waikaremoana
 Piripiri Point, Auckland, on Te Araroa long distance walkway, north of Pōhutukawa Bay
 a  mountain above Picton in the Robertson Range

Piripiri had a cheese factory from at least 1910 to 1935.

The local post office, called Matatera, opened in 1909, or 1910. Piripiri PO closed in 1913 and Matatera was renamed Piripiri in 1923.

History 
The area was part of the Ngāti Raukawa rohe. In 1887 the Court ruled that compensation for  taken by the Crown should be £67 19s, rather than the £25 to £45 per acre asked for by the owners. Piripiri had a population of 70 in 1901, 229 in 1911, 84 in 1951 and 89 in 1961.

State Highway 2 
It was designated as a Main Highway in 1924, which later became SH2. There had been a fatal crash at the level crossing in 1913.

Railway station 
Piripiri had a railway station from 1896 to 1958. A siding opened in 1894, a decade after the line was built. Its main purpose was to carry timber from the dense Seventy Mile bush, through which the railway had been cut.

Although the line through Piripiri to Tahoraiti was reported as ready to open on 1 December 1884, it wasn't until 15 December 1884 that the  Matamau to Tahoraiti section opened, extending the line from Napier. The surrounding bush was leased in 1892, but an 1891 application for loading of firewood was refused, as it was said to be too close to Mangatera. Piripiri siding opened on 10 August 1894, but for use only by Rathbone & Mathews. In 1896 it had a loop for 4 wagons.

From Monday, 1 June 1896 passenger trains called at the station, though no buildings were provided. From 15 August 1898 mixed trains stopped for parcels. By 1905 the station had a shelter shed with storeroom and cart approach to a platform and a passing loop for 35 wagons. A urinal was added in 1915. In 1966 Piripiri had a shelter very similar to the one which remains at Matamau.

Also in 1894 Thomas Baker laid a tramway for Robert Holt's sawmill, which was milling kahikatea, matai, rimu and totara An 1898 fire burnt down their mill, but it had a 24-wagon siding in 1900, which was taken over by the Lands Department in 1908. It remained open for all to use until at least 1914.

In 1900 Gamman built a new mill. A 1902 photo showed 22 workers at the mill. Gamman also had mills around the region at Ākitio, Bunnythorpe, Kumeroa, Manakau, Ohakune and Tahoraiti.

The bush had largely gone by 1908 and the mills ran out of timber to fell after 1923.

On 1 July 1938 Piripiri became a tablet switch-out station. 

On Sunday 16 November 1958 Piripiri closed to all traffic. A single track runs through the station site.

Demographics
The SA1 area is part of the larger Norsewood statistical area.

The SA1 statistical area had a population of 132 at the 2018 New Zealand census, a decrease of 12 people (−8.3%) since the 2013 census, and a decrease of 18 people (−12.0%) since the 2006 census. There were 51 households, comprising 66 males and 66 females, giving a sex ratio of 1.0 males per female. The median age was 49.7 years (compared with 37.4 years nationally), with 24 people (18.2%) aged under 15 years, 18 (13.6%) aged 15 to 29, 60 (45.5%) aged 30 to 64, and 33 (25.0%) aged 65 or older.

Ethnicities were 97.7% European/Pākehā, 18.2% Māori, and 2.3% Pacific peoples. People may identify with more than one ethnicity.

Although some people chose not to answer the census's question about religious affiliation, 40.9% had no religion, and 47.7% were Christian.

Of those at least 15 years old, 9 (8.3%) people had a bachelor's or higher degree, and 36 (33.3%) people had no formal qualifications. The median income was $32,100, compared with $31,800 nationally. 15 people (13.9%) earned over $70,000 compared to 17.2% nationally. The employment status of those at least 15 was that 48 (44.4%) people were employed full-time and 24 (22.2%) were part-time.

Piripiri Viaduct 
It is now Bridge 146, a short distance east of Piripiri station.

An 1882 contract gave the job of building Piripiri and Mangatera viaducts to M McKenzie of Dunedin for £9,350. It was built with totara.

J & A Anderson & Co of Christchurch won a tender for a steel and concrete replacement. It was rebuilt in 1899-1900,  higher than the original bridge. The new Piri Piri Viaduct was tested under the weight of five locomotives in December 1900 and put to use on 31 January 1901.  In the same era Andersons also rebuilt Kopua (1895), Makotuku (1898), Mangatera (1900), Ormondville (1906) and Makatote (1908) viaducts. There was a fire on the bridge on 29 October 1933. Underpinning with reinforced concrete beams was tendered for in 1969.

References

External links 
Photos -

 Piripiri Stream and railway viaduct about 1887, 1993
 Piripiri post office about 1900
 Gamman's sawmill in 1902
 1914 stream

Populated places in Manawatū-Whanganui
Viaducts in New Zealand
Railway bridges in New Zealand
Bridges in Manawatū-Whanganui
Railway stations in New Zealand
Tararua District
Rail transport in Manawatū-Whanganui
Buildings and structures in Manawatū-Whanganui
Defunct railway stations in New Zealand
Railway stations closed in 1958
Railway stations opened in 1894